Kvirikashvili is a Georgian surname. Notable people with the surname include:

Giorgi Kvirikashvili (born 1967), Georgian politician
Merab Kvirikashvili (born 1983), Georgian rugby union player

Georgian-language surnames